Sven Bertil Erlander (25 May 1934 – 13 June 2021) was a Swedish mathematician and academic.

Biography
Erlander was the son of Tage Erlander, who was the Prime Minister of Sweden from 1946 to 1969. He published several of his father's diaries.

He received his Ph.D. in mathematics from Stockholm University in 1968. In 1971 he became a professor in Optimisation at Linköping University. In Linköping he was department head of the Mathematics department 1973–1976, and dean of the Institute of Technology between 1978 and 1983. 

In 1983–1995 he was the rector of Linköping University.

Awards 
 Member of the Royal Swedish Academy of Engineering Sciences, 1983
 Honorary Doctorate, Gdańsk University, Poland

Publications 
 Cost-Minimizing Choice Behavior in Transportation Planning, monograph, Springer Verlag, 2010.

References

External links 
 Prof. Sven Erlander's CV
 

1934 births
2021 deaths
Swedish mathematicians
Stockholm University alumni
Academic staff of Linköping University
Children of national leaders
Members of the Royal Swedish Academy of Engineering Sciences
People from Halmstad